"Sorrow" is a song first recorded by the McCoys in 1965 and released as the B-side to their cover of "Fever". It became a big hit in the United Kingdom in a version by the Merseys, reaching number 4 on the UK chart on 28 April 1966. A version by David Bowie charted worldwide in 1973.

A line from the song – "With your long blonde hair and your eyes of blue" – is used in the Beatles song "It's All Too Much" which was featured on their 1969 album Yellow Submarine.

The Merseys version

The Merseys' version is more up-tempo than the McCoys' folk-rock original. Propelled by Clem Cattini's drumming it features a powerful horn arrangement (most probably the work of John Paul Jones). The horns also take the solo which, on the McCoys version, is performed on harmonica. As the number and quality of subsequent covers demonstrate, the Merseys' single was highly regarded among British musicians.

Charts

David Bowie version

David Bowie's remake of "Sorrow", recorded in July 1973 at Château d'Hérouville, Hérouville, France, was the only single released in the UK from his Pin Ups covers album, reaching No. 3 on the UK Singles Chart, and staying in the charts for 15 weeks. It was also Bowie's first number one hit single in Australia, where it topped the charts for two weeks in February 1974.

The B-side, “Amsterdam”, was a cover of a Jacques Brel song, that had been performed live by Bowie since 1968. The song may have been recorded by Bowie in the summer 1973 sessions for Pin Ups or in late 1971 for the album Ziggy Stardust. Never selected as an album track, it was used as the single B-side as it fitted with "Sorrow". In France, it was billed as the A-side of the single.

"Sorrow" was featured in the 2008 John Cusack film War, Inc. In 2017 Paul Shaffer and Jenny Lewis released a cover version based mainly on Bowie's version.

Track listing
 "Sorrow" (Bob Feldman, Jerry Goldstein, Richard Gottehrer) – 2:53
 "Amsterdam" (Jacques Brel, Mort Shuman) – 2:39

The Spanish release of the single had "Lady Grinning Soul" as the B-side.

Personnel
 Producers:
 Ken Scott and David Bowie
 Musicians:
 David Bowie: vocals, guitar, saxophone on "Sorrow"
 Mick Ronson: guitar and string arrangement on "Sorrow"
 Trevor Bolder: bass on "Sorrow"
 Mike Garson: piano on "Sorrow"
 Aynsley Dunbar: drums on "Sorrow"
 G. A. MacCormack: backing vocals on "Sorrow"
 Ken Fordham: saxophone on "Sorrow"

Charts

Other releases
 The song appeared on the following Bowie compilations:
 Chameleon (Australia/New Zealand 1979)
 The Best of Bowie (1980)
 Sound + Vision box set (1989)
 The Singles Collection (1993)
 The Best of David Bowie 1969/1974 (1997)
 Best of Bowie (2002)
 The Platinum Collection (2006)
 Nothing Has Changed (2014)
 Bowie Legacy (2-CD version) (2016)
 It also appeared on the following Bowie live albums:
 Serious Moonlight (Live '83) (recorded September 1983, released 2019)
 I'm Only Dancing (The Soul Tour 74) (recorded October 1974, released 2020)

References

Pegg, Nicholas, The Complete David Bowie, Reynolds & Hearn Ltd, 2000, 

1965 songs
1973 singles
Songs written by Jerry Goldstein (producer)
Songs written by Richard Gottehrer
The McCoys songs
David Bowie songs
Number-one singles in Australia
Number-one singles in New Zealand
Fontana Records singles
RCA Records singles
1966 debut singles
Song recordings produced by Kit Lambert
Song recordings produced by Ken Scott
Songs written by Bob Feldman